Steenberg United is a South African football club. The club plays in the SAFA Second Division.

History 
Steenberg United won the Western Cape Stream of the 2018–19 SAFA Second Division, earning the right to play in the playoffs for promotion to the 2019–20 National First Division for the third time in four years.

They qualified for the playoff final, successfully earning promotion, where they lost 1-0 to JDR Stars, earning R500,000 in prize money.

They finished 8th in 2019–20, but ended 15th in 2020–21, being relegated back to the 2021–22 SAFA Second Division.

Honours 
SAFA Second Division Western Cape Stream:
Winners – 2008–09, 2015–16, 2017–18 2018–19

References 

Soccer clubs in Cape Town